Seaport with the Embarkation of Saint Ursula is an oil painting on canvas of 1641 by Claude Lorrain, signed and dated by the artist. The work was produced for Fausto Poli, who two years later was made a cardinal by Pope Urban VIII. It is now in the National Gallery in London, which acquired it in 1824 as part of the collection of John Julius Angerstein.

References

Paintings of Saint Ursula
Maritime paintings
1641 paintings
Paintings by Claude Lorrain
Collections of the National Gallery, London